Septodont is a French pharmaceutical and medical device company mainly dedicated to developing, manufacturing and distributing dental consumables. It is headquartered in Saint-Maur-des-Fossés (France)

History 
Septodont was founded in France in 1932 by Annie & Nestor Schiller. In the 1950s and 1960s, under the leadership of Henri Schiller, Septodont started to introduce dental therapeutics and to focus on dental anesthesia with local anesthetics in single use cartridges. Beyond the focus on dental anesthesia, Septodont invested in Research and Development towards bioactive and biocompatible therapeutic solutions.

Septodont acquired 2 companies in Brazil, first TDV in 2014 for restorative material, and DLA in 2016 for injectable anesthetics. The company also acquired Duoject in 2015, a Canadian company dedicated to design for injection devices, and opened in 2016 a new manufacturing unit for injectable anesthetics in its headquarter in Saint-Maur-des-Fossés in France.

Beyond the dental field, through its subsidiary Novocol Healthcare, Septodont is also dedicated to partnering with pharmaceutical and medical device companies.

Septodont remains today a 100% family owned business under the leadership of his CEO Olivier Schiller.

Products 
 Dental anesthesia: topical and local anesthetics, safety devices, needles, syringes and reversals
 Endodontics & restorative products
 Regeneration & surgery

Notes & references

External links 
 Official website

Medical technology companies of France
Dental companies
French brands